Anabell Gardoqui de la Reguera (born 8 April 1977) is a Mexican actress. She has starred in telenovelas, films, the HBO television series Eastbound & Down and Capadocia, the Amazon television series Goliath, and the 2006 comedy Nacho Libre.

Early life
Reguera was born in Veracruz, Mexico. Her mother, Nena de la Reguera, was a Miss Veracruz who became a journalist and television personality. Reguera began taking classes in classic ballet and later began performance arts studies at Instituto Veracruzano de la Cultura. She left Veracruz to study at Televisa's CEA, and later studied with Juan Carlos Corazza in Spain and then in Los Angeles with Aaron Spicer, Lisa Robertson, and Joan Scheckel.

Acting career
Telenovelas
Reguera's acting career began with her role in the telenovela Azul (1996) followed by Pueblo chico, infierno grande (1997), with Verónica Castro, for which she received the Heraldo award for best female acting, and Desencuentro which was her third telenovela under the direction of Ernesto Alonso.Tentaciones (1998) marked her beginning with the production company Argos Comunicación. She was immediately offered a role in Tentaciones and Todo por amor, for which she received the Palmas de or award.Cara o Cruz was the first telenovela to be co-producted between Argos Comunicación and Telemundo. Reguera played María Salome in the telenovela Gitanas.

Television

In 2014, Reguera was cast in the Netflix crime drama Narcos as Elisa.

Reguera played the role of Lorena Guerra in the HBO series Capadocia. It ran for three seasons, beginning in 2008. The series received good reviews and awards.

Other television credits include Eastbound & Down, Twin Peaks, Power, From Dusk Till Dawn and The Blacklist.

Reguera played the role of Marisol Silva in season 2 of Goliath as part of the main cast, and in season 3 as a recurring character.  Season 2 aired in 2018 on Amazon Prime, while season 3 aired in 2019 on the same service.

Theater
Reguera participated in El Cartero, directed by Raúl Quintanilla, for which she received two awards from the Mexican Association of Theatre Journalists. She then played Desdemona in Othello and Danna in the play Nadando con Tiburones, alongside Demián Bichir and Alfonso Herrera.

Film
Her introduction to film was in Por la libre. Later she appeared in Ladies Night alongside Ana Claudia Talancón, for which she received an MTV Movie Award for 'Favorite Actress'. At the 40th Diosas de Plata Awards of the Mexican Cinema, she received the Dolores del Rio award. In 2005 she played the starring role in Gitanas which aired on Telemundo.

She is known for her role as Sister Encarnación in Nacho Libre. She played Sam Rockwell's wife Maria in Cowboys & Aliens.

She won a CANCACINE and Imagen Award for her role in Backyard, a 2009 Mexican crime film directed by directed by Carlos Carrera which was Mexican Choice for foreign film at the Oscars.

In 2010, she played the historical Josefa Quintana, a mistress of Mexican Independence War hero Miguel Hidalgo, played by Demián Bichir, in the film Hidalgo: La historia jamás contada.

Reguera played Carla in MGM's teen romance Everything, Everything.

Other ventures
In 2006, Reguera hosted the MTV Video Music Awards Latin America. She also co-hosted the 2018 Latin Grammy Awards alongside Carlos Rivera.

Reguera has been the face of CoverGirl, to be one of the company's official faces.

Charity
In September 2010, Ana De La Reguera  founded VeraCruzANA, a civil association. VeraCruzANA supports the underprivileged community in Veracruz, Mexico. It seeks to generate employment by promoting projects and programs that contribute to the development of community.

In 2017, Ana De La Reguera served as chair of the ONE Children's Foundation, a 501 C3 non-profit organization founded by Claudia Pinto in the city of Los Angeles, which gave birth to Los Angeles en Mexico'', a movement created by herself,  Karla Souza, Kate del Castillo and Olga Segura, after the earthquake that hit Mexico on September 19, 2017.

Filmography

Television

References

External links

 
 

1977 births
Living people
Mexican film actresses
Mexican telenovela actresses
Mexican television actresses
Actresses from Veracruz
Mexican female models
People from Veracruz (city)
Mexican expatriates in the United States
20th-century Mexican actresses
21st-century Mexican actresses
Mexican expatriate actors in the United States